Carl W. McCardle (May 31, 1904 - July 11, 1972) was born in Cameron, West Virginia and earned a B.S. at Washington and Jefferson College. He was Assistant Secretary of State for Public Affairs from 1953 to 1957. 
 
From 1923 to 1949, McCardle was a reporter and correspondent for multiple news agencies including the Moundsville Echo (West Virginia), the Washington Observer (Pennsylvania), and the Philadelphia Bulletin (Pennsylvania).

From Jan 29, 1953 to Jan 30, 1957, McCardle was Assistant Secretary of State for Public Affairs. Following his government career, he was assistant to the chairman of the board of the Penn-Tex Corporation from 1957 to 1958. In 1959 he served as an executive for Pan American World Airways. In 1960, McCardle returned to his roots as a reporter for the Wheeling Intelligencer in West Virginia.

References

External links
  Papers of Carl W. McCardle, Dwight D. Eisenhower Presidential Library

1904 births
1972 deaths
Washington & Jefferson College alumni
American male journalists
20th-century American journalists
Eisenhower administration personnel
People from Marshall County, West Virginia
20th-century American writers
United States Assistant Secretaries of State